, stylized as 8ing, is a Japanese video game developer and publisher. It is known for its shoot 'em ups and its licensed fighting games.

History 
Raizing and Eighting were formed in part by former staff of Compile, to create arcade games. The development was done by Raizing, while sales and distribution were done by Eighting. Their first game, Mahou Daisakusen/Sorcer Striker was released in 1993. After the arcade developer Toaplan closed their doors, some of their staff went to Raizing, while others began the offshoot companies Cave, Takumi, and Gazelle, all of which were noted for their strong support of the shoot 'em up genre, and the "danmaku" (or "manic") subgenre in particular. Raizing continued to use arcade hardware based on Toaplan's units for years after Toaplan's demise.

The company featured a handful of former Compile employees, mainly those who worked on Musha Aleste, including Yuichi Toyama (a.k.a. "Healthy"), Kazuyuki Nakashima, and Yokoo Kenichi. The company also included the famous shooting game developer Shinobu Yagawa who was the designer and programmer for Battle Garegga, Armed Police Batrider, and Battle Bakraid while at Raizing, and is now employed by Cave.

In October 2000, the Raizing division was incorporated into Eighting, and since then, no shooter games were produced. The company since then concentrated its video game business to home consoles and mobile/social gaming.

List of games developed

Raizing titles

Eighting titles

Notes

References

External links
8ing.net (English)
R8ZING: A Raizing/Eighting Shooter Tribute
Interview with Sotoyama Yuuichi and Yokoo Kenich from Shooting Gameside #1 Magazine

Amusement companies of Japan
Video game companies of Japan
Video game development companies
Video game companies established in 1993
Japanese companies established in 1993
Software companies based in Tokyo